Mykki Blanco (born April 2, 1986) is an American rapper, performance artist, poet and activist. She has collaborated musically with artists including Kanye West, Teyana Taylor, and Blood Orange.

Early life
Blanco was born in Orange County, California. Her father, Michael Quattlebaum Sr., was an IT specialist before becoming a psychic. Her mother, Deborah Butler, was a paralegal at the North Carolina Patent and Trademark Office. Her father's side is African-American Jewish. Blanco's parents divorced when she was 2 years old. As a child, she lived in San Mateo County, California, near her paternal grandparents, before moving to Raleigh, North Carolina. She attended Enloe High School.

At the age of 15, Blanco won an Indies Spirit Award for the performance collective she founded, Paint In Consciousness Experimental Theater, in Raleigh.

When Blanco was 16, she ran away from home before moving to New York City. She then spent time in California, before winning a full scholarship to attend the School of the Art Institute of Chicago, but dropped out of college after two semesters in 2006. She also briefly attended Parsons School of Design in New York City.

Career
Blanco's book of poetry, From the Silence of Duchamp to the Noise of Boys, was published on OHWOW's imprint on June 17, 2011.

In 2012, Blanco made her musical debut with an EP, Mykki Blanco & the Mutant Angels.

In November 2012, Blanco released the mixtape Cosmic Angel: The Illuminati Prince/ss. The mixtape was produced by Brenmar, Flosstradamus, Gobby, Le1f, Boody, Matrixxman, and Sinden. She makes an appearance in the album Junto by Basement Jaxx.

In 2013, Blanco released her second EP Betty Rubble: The Initiation. May 2014 saw the release of the Spring/Summer 2014 EP, followed by her second mixtape Gay Dog Food in October. Gay Dog Food features a spoken word track with Kathleen Hanna, and contributions from Cities Aviv, Cakes Da Killa, and more.

Blanco's debut album, Mykki, was released on September 16, 2016.

Blanco's ad-libs appeared on Teyana Taylor's song "WTP", from her June 2018 album K.T.S.E.; she also has writing and production credits on the track. Blanco notably was not paid for these contributions until July 2020, more than two years later.

In 2018, Blanco collaborated with Kanye West on the track "Bye Bye Baby" for West's scrapped album Yandhi; the track was later leaked.

Blanco released Broken Hearts & Beauty Sleep through Transgressive Records in June 2021.

Artistry

The persona Mykki Blanco began as a teenage girl character for a YouTube video in 2010, but evolved into a musical and performance art piece. Blanco's name is inspired by Lil' Kim's alter ego Kimmy Blanco. Her influences include Lil' Kim, GG Allin, Jean Cocteau, Kathleen Hanna, Lauryn Hill, Rihanna, Marilyn Manson, and Anaïs Nin. She is also inspired by the riot grrrl movement and queercore, namely the director Bruce LaBruce and the drag queen Vaginal Davis.

Blanco has been called one of hip hop's queer pioneers; although she struggles to identify with the label of "gay rap" or "queer rap", she has begrudgingly "accepted it". Blanco also disagrees with those who portray her as a drag artist, saying "You can't tag me as the rapping transvestite. I never vogued in my life. I'm from a punk and Riot Grrrl background." Blanco has often described herself in terms of other artists, saying that she's not a "Marilyn Manson" or even a rapper, but rather says she wants to be Yoko Ono. In fact, her album Mykki was originally going to be named Michael in reference to Michael Jackson. Blanco, along with Rosie O'Donnell and Anderson Cooper, presented Madonna with the GLAAD Advocate for Change award on May 5, 2019, in Manhattan.

Blanco has also tried to bring her "persona" closer and closer to her non-artist self, having to repeatedly say through interviews and alike that she is indeed transfeminine, and that the aesthetic evolution of Mykki Blanco over the years is the aesthetic evolution of her entire self, rather than just a "drag performance". Mykki Blanco places a lot of emphasis on her music videos and art performances, often taking complex and fresh new takes on her ever-moving aesthetic, and is constantly trying out new looks and performances just as genre-defying as her musical style.

Personal life
In June 2015, Blanco revealed via her Facebook page that she has been HIV positive since 2011. Blanco initially worried that being HIV positive would be detrimental to her career, saying of the decision to make finally that information public, "I did it for myself. At a certain point, my real life has to be more important than this career". She made this information public via Facebook during Pride season. Over 12,000 users liked the post and over 700 shared it.

Blanco had expressed concern that the music industry would shut her down because of her public announcement: "I thought when I came out that was going to be the end," she says. "Mykki Blanco is fun. Talking about HIV is not fun. How could I be fun and have HIV?" She mentions that during that time period she had made plans to become an investigative journalist to report on LGBT issues on a global scale, yet that the flood of positive reactions in response to her coming out as HIV positive have made her determined to continue her artistry.

 Mykki Blanco identifies as transgender and uses she or they pronouns. Blanco has used different gender pronouns throughout her career. She began hormone therapy for her gender transition in 2019.

Discography

Studio albums

Extended plays

Mixtapes

Singles

As lead artist

As a featured artist

Music videos

Published works
 From the Silence of Duchamp to the Noise of Boys (2011)

See also
 LGBT culture in New York City
 List of LGBT people from New York City

Notes

References

External links
 
 

1986 births
Living people
American gay writers
School of the Art Institute of Chicago alumni
American gay musicians
LGBT African Americans
LGBT people from California
LGBT people from New York (state)
American LGBT rights activists
American people of Jewish descent
African-American Jews
People with HIV/AIDS
LGBT rappers
Musicians from Orange County, California
William G. Enloe High School alumni
LGBT Jews
Transgender musicians
American LGBT singers
Transgender women
20th-century American LGBT people
21st-century American LGBT people